The 2005–06 Vysshaya Liga season was the 14th season of the Vysshaya Liga, the second level of ice hockey in Russia. 28 teams participated in the league. Traktor Chelyabinsk, Krylya Sovetov Moscow, and Amur Khabarovsk were promoted to the Russian Superleague.

First round

Western Conference

Eastern Conference

Playoffs

3rd place
 (W2) Dizel Penza – (E2) Amur Khabarovsk 1:1, 1:4

External links 
 Season on hockeyarchives.info
 Season on hockeyarchives.ru

2005–06 in Russian ice hockey leagues
Rus
Russian Major League seasons